Simon Crane (born 1960) is a British stuntman, stunt coordinator, second unit director and film director.

Biography
Born in Twickenham, Middlesex, England. Crane was originally a law student, but not liking it, he dropped out after one year and worked as an acrobat in a circus for three years. To fulfill English requirements for stuntmen to achieve instructor level in six sports, Crane became an instructor in gymnastics, parachuting, scuba diving, high diving, karate, and fencing. When he could not obtain a union card as a stuntman fast enough, he became an instructor in three more sports, including hang gliding. His father, Dr. John Crane, was the doctor for Arsenal F.C and the England national football team.

Career
Crane's first major work came in the 1985 Bond film A View to a Kill. In 1987 he became Timothy Dalton's stunt double in The Living Daylights. He also played the character of Che Che in a reenactment of the "gatecrasher" fight scene from On Her Majesty's Secret Service traditionally used to test the fighting skills of actors up for the part of James Bond. Vic Armstrong coordinated the fight. Actors believed to have tested opposite Crane in the screen tests include Mark Greenstreet, Sam Neill and Pierce Brosnan. 

After spending five years as the apprentice to an experienced stunt coordinator, Crane was allowed to act as second unit stunt coordinator on Licence to Kill. In 1993, Crane performed the dangerous-looking aerial transfer for the film Cliffhanger, for which he earned an entry in the Guinness Book of World Records for being part of the most expensive stunt ever performed. It cost $1 million to have Simon Crane descending on a rope between two planes at an altitude of 4,572 m (15,000 ft).

In 1995 he became the overall stunt coordinator for GoldenEye – the opening bungee jump was voted the greatest film stunt ever in a poll for Sky Movies. After a four-year break from the Bond franchise, during which he coordinated stunts for the Academy-Award-winning films Titanic (in which he happened to play fourth officer Joseph Boxhall, and had two lines) and Saving Private Ryan, Crane returned to handle the stunts for The World Is Not Enough, with Vic Armstrong as second unit director.

Crane also took the role of stunt coordinator in Will Smith's Hancock (2008).
He was to make his directorial début directing a film adaptation of the popular video game, Kane & Lynch: Dead Men but departed from the project. Crane directed the 3-D supernatural thriller The Peak, which was based on a screenplay from Neal Marshall Stevens and Crane worked with Will Smith again as second unit director and stunt coordinator on Men in Black 3.

Partial filmography
 The Living Daylights (1987) – Gibraltar Soldier #1 (uncredited)
 Blue Ice (1992) – Secret Serviceman (uncredited)
 GoldenEye (1995) – Lt. François Brouse – Tiger Helicopter Pilot (uncredited)
 Titanic (1997) – 4th Officer Joseph Boxhall

References

External links
 

Living people
British stunt performers
1960 births